The verbal morphology of Armenian is complicated by the existence of two main dialects, Eastern and Western.  The following sketch will be a comparative look at both dialects.

Non-finite forms

Infinitive
The infinitive of Armenian verbs is formed with the stem, the theme vowel, and the affix -լ (-l).

The endings reflect the number of conjugations possible.  Western Armenian is conservative, retaining three conjugations in a, e, and i, while Eastern Armenian has collapsed I and II:

Stems
There are two main stems per verb, the present stem and past stem.  For conjugations I/II, the past stem is identical to the present stem, which is basically the verb minus the theme vowel and ending:

The augment for the third conjugation is sometimes in -եց (-ec῾).

Participles
The number and type of participles varies by dialect.

Future participle
Both Eastern and Western Armenian form the common future participle in -լու (-lu).  Western Armenian has one additional future participle in -լիք (-lik῾):

Present and past participles

Present
Eastern Armenian has three present participles, while Western Armenian has one.  The two exclusively Eastern present participles are in -ում (-um) (for all verb classes) and -լիս (-lis); both affixes attach to the present stem.  Eastern and Western Armenian have a common present participle -ող (-oġ), which attaches to the past stem; it is sometimes used as an agentive noun: ուսանող (usanoġ student) [fr. ուսանել usanel to study)].

Past
All affixes here attach to the past stem.  Both dialects have a common past passive participle in -ած (WA -aj/EA -ac).  Where the dialects differ is the past active participle. The Western Armenian participle is -եր (-er) for all conjugations, while Eastern Armenian has -ել (-el).

Finite forms

Introduction: general overview
Armenian features within its verbal system a system that encodes person and number, as well as tense, mood, and aspect (see following section for more.)

Armenian inherited from Indo-European two sets of synthetic affixes corresponding roughly to a "present" or general series, and a past series:

How these affixes are used varies between the two modern dialects of Armenian.

Tense/mood/aspect
Both dialects have five moods: indicative, conditional, optative/subjunctive, necessitative, imperative; of these only the imperative has no tense distinction.  The number of tenses varies by dialect.  Aspect is divided roughly the same in both dialects, but the distribution is slightly different.

Indicative mood
Both Eastern and Western feature one present, one future, and two past tenses (imperfect, preterite).  Their formation varies by dialect.

Present
Formation of the present tense differs between Eastern and Western.  In form, the present indicative of Eastern Armenian has no corresponding Western formation.  However, the Western present indicative is formed identically to the Eastern present conditional.

Eastern Armenian uses the -ում (-um) participle with the present tense of Eastern Armenian verb  լինել (linel "to be").  Western Armenian uses a synthetic general form of the verb preceded by the particle կը gë /gə/.  The synthetic form conjugates according to the verb's theme vowel (i.e., e, i, or a).

In Armenian, final /j/ in polysyllabic words is silent.

Imperfect
The formation of the imperfect is similar to the present-tense formation in both dialects.  Eastern Armenian uses the -ում (-um) participle with the imperfect of verb  լինել (linel "to be").  Western Armenian uses a synthetic imperfect form of the verb preceded by the particle կը gë /gə/.

Future
Like the formation of the present tense, the future tense in Armenian intersects two varying constructions with opposite meanings.  The Eastern future tense is made with the future participle in -լու (-lu) with the present tense of verb  լինել (linel).  (This Eastern form is identical to the Western Armenian non-past necessitative (see below.))  The Western future tense is made with the general synthetic verb preceded by the particle պիտի (bidi).  (This Western form is identical to the Eastern Armenian non-past necessitative (see below.))

Preterite
In various grammars, this is called the preterite, the perfect, or sometimes the aorist.  Both Eastern and Western Armenian use a synthetic preterite, which is formed by deleting the infinitive marker and theme vowel, then:
· Class I and II verbs (in both dialects) add -եց (-ec῾);
· Class III verbs add -աց (-ac῾).

The preterite affixes are similar to the imperfect endings of the verb "to be" (Eastern լինել linel, Western ըլլալ ëllal)

In Class III verbs (a-thematic verbs), the preterite stem and the past stem are identical.

Optative mood
The optative mood (called the subjunctive in some grammars) in Armenian is identical in both dialects.  There are two tenses: non-past (present, etc...) and past (perfect, etc. ...).

Non-past
The non-past optative is the simple "present" conjugated form, as compared to other Indo-European languages:

1Historically, verbs of the third conjugation ended in final յ, which in traditional orthography is silent in word final position. Due to spelling reforms conducted in the earliest 20th century, final յ is missing from the Eastern conjugation

Past
The past optative is the simple "imperfect" conjugated form, as compared to other Indo-European languages:

1
In both dialects, the combinations եի and էի are pronounced as though spelt "եյի" and "էյի", meaning that սիրեի and սիրէի are both pronounced .  The latent yod յ is written and pronounced in class III verbs.

Conditional mood

The conditional is mostly similar in both dialects.

In Eastern Armenian, the non-past conditional is formed by affixing կ-  before the non-past optative.  With this formation, Eastern Armenian also has a past conditional with k-  plus past optative.  Due to phonological restrictions, կ  is pronounced  before another consonant: կկարդա   (He would read); կկարդային   (They would have read).

Western Armenian does the same, but it has another form identical to its Future in the Past (for the past conditional). The former has always been more prevalent, while the latter is falling in disuse.

The Eastern conditional forms, with slight orthographic variation, are identical to the Western present and imperfect indicative forms:

The second (less prevalent) Western Armenian conditional is identical to the Eastern Past Necessitative.

Imperative mood

1Optional spoken forms

In both Eastern and Western Armenian, the imperative consists of the affirmative and the negative, and singular and plural forms (based on the second person you).

Necessitative mood

Both dialects have what is known as the necessitative mood (also found in Turkish).  Both dialects have a past and a non-past necessitative.   Eastern Armenian forms its necessitative by adding particle piti before the optative forms.  Western Armenian forms its necessitative with the lu future participle plus the forms of әllal (to be)

Note that the EA particle piti is orthographically identical to the Western particle bidi, meaning that the Eastern necessitative forms are identical in form to the Western future indicative and conditional.   Also note that the Western necessitative forms correspond to Eastern future indicative (and future perfect (see below)):

Voice
Armenian has two voices: Active and Passive.

All the forms above are Active. To make them passive, add the identifying letter վ in front of the ending.

Present and past perfect

Note: In Western Armenian, the present perfect and past perfect have two forms. One is formed by the past active participle and the verb to be (սիրեր եմ), while the other uses the more prevalent past (passive) participle (սիրած եմ). The first may denote the mediative (evidential or non evidential), the inferential, or the reportative. The second is more akin to the Eastern Perfect and the resultative.

The present perfect is formed with the l-past participle plus the present form of լինել (linel "to be").  The past perfect (pluperfect) is the l-past participle plus the imperfect of linel.

Future perfect (future in the past)

The Eastern future perfect (future in the past) indicative is formed like the future indicative tense (using the lu-participle), substituting the present forms of the verb լինել linel with the imperfect.

In Western Armenian, it is identical to the imperfect, substituting կը with պիտի'.

This tense is used with events which were most likely to happen, which were to happen, according to the speaker's firm conviction, but they either haven't happened, or it's not known.

A table of the perfect forms thus:

Putting it all together

A comparison of forms

There are two tables, showing the full conjugation of each dialect's verb paradigms, Eastern and Western.

External links

 Conjugation tool : Enter a verb in armenian, english or french and see it conjugated in armenian
 iOS Armenian Conjugation App

Armenian language
Indo-European verbs